Changji is a county-level city and seat of the Changji Hui Autonomous Prefecture, Xinjiang, China.

Changji may also refer to:

Changji Hui Autonomous Prefecture, a prefecture of Xinjiang, China

See also 
 Changqi (disambiguation)
 Janggi (also spelled changgi), Korean board game
 Jangji-dong, a neighbourhood of Seoul